Linn Siri Jensen (born 18 January 1961) is a Norwegian team handball goalkeeper and coach.

She played 122 matches for the national team. She won a bronze medal at the 1986 World Women's Handball Championship in the Netherlands. Clubs include Fyllingen IL and IL Vestar.

References

External links
 

1961 births
Living people
Norwegian female handball players
Norwegian handball coaches
Sportspeople from Bergen
20th-century Norwegian women